The 127th Pennsylvania Infantry Regiment was a regiment in the Union Army during the American Civil War.  As part of the Second Corps of the Army of the Potomac, it fought in battles such as Fredericksburg and Chancellorsville.

History

Recruitment
The 127th Pennsylvania included recruits mainly from Harrisburg and its environs.  The regiment was mustered in on August 16, 1862, and first commanded by Colonel William W. Jennings.  On August 17, 1862, men of the 59th were assigned to the defense of Washington, D.C., and then, in December 1862, to the Second Corps of the Army of the Potomac.

Monuments
There is a monument to the 127th Pennsylvania at Fredericksburg and Spotsylvania National Military Park .

See also
https://stonesentinels.com/fredericksburg/tour-battlefield/stop-one/127th-pa-monument/

References
 https://ia600207.us.archive.org/19/items/historyof127thre00penn/historyof127thre00penn.pdf
 https://www.pa-roots.com/pacw/infantry/127th/127thorg.html
 https://civilwarintheeast.com/us-regiments-batteries/pennsylvania/127th-pennsylvania-infantry/

Units and formations of the Union Army from Pennsylvania
Military units and formations disestablished in 1863
Military units and formations established in 1862
1862 establishments in Pennsylvania